Adam Peltzman is an American television writer and producer. He wrote for various shows at Nickelodeon before creating his own Nick Jr. series, Wallykazam!, for which he was the head writer and executive producer. Peltzman was also head writer for the third season of the rebooted Electric Company series, and he co-created the live-action show Odd Squad with Tim McKeon. Peltzman is currently the showrunner and executive producer of the Netflix series, Go, Dog. Go!

Filmography

Television

Film

References

External links

Living people
American male television actors
American television writers
American male television writers
Year of birth missing (living people)